Berra is a comune (municipality) in the Province of Ferrara in the Italian region Emilia-Romagna, located about  northeast of Bologna and about  northeast of Ferrara.

Berra borders the following municipalities: Ariano nel Polesine, Codigoro, Copparo, Crespino, Jolanda di Savoia, Mesola, Papozze, Ro, Villanova Marchesana.

References

External links
 Official website

Cities and towns in Emilia-Romagna